Allium beesianum is a plant species native to southern China, provinces of Yunnan and Sichuan. It grows on slopes and in meadows at elevations of 3000–4200 m.

Allium beesianum produces cylindrical bulbs up to 10 mm in diameter. Scapes are round in cross-section, up to 60 cm tall. Umbels appear hemispheric from a distance. Flowers are blue.

References

beesianum
Onions
Flora of China
Flora of Sichuan
Flora of Yunnan
Plants described in 1914